Ji-young, also spelled Jee-young, Ji-yeong, or Chi-young, is a Korean feminine given name. The meaning differs based on the hanja used to write each syllable of the name. There are 61 hanja with the reading "ji" and 44 hanja with the reading "young" on the South Korean government's official list of hanja which may be registered for use in given names. It was the most popular name for baby girls born in South Korea in 1970, falling to third place in 1980 and tenth place in 1990.

People with this name include:

Athletes
 Mo Ji-yeong (born 1964), South Korean male field hockey player
 Pearl Sinn (born Sinn Ji-young, 1967), South Korean-born American female golfer
 Lee Ji-young (field hockey) (born 1971), South Korean female field hockey player
 Lee Jee-young (born 1985), South Korean female golfer
 Lee Ji-young (baseball) (born 1986), South Korean male baseball player
 Oh Ji-young (born 1988), South Korean female volleyball player
 Oh Ji-young (golfer) (born 1988), South Korean female golfer
 Lee Ji-young (swimmer) (born 1989), South Korean female swimmer

Entertainers
 Kim Ji-young (actress, born 1938), South Korean actress
 Park Ji-young (actress) (born 1969), South Korean actress
 Kim Ji-young (actress, born 1974), South Korean actress
 Baek Ji-young (born 1976), South Korean female pop and ballad singer
 Kim Ji-yeong (voice actress) (born 1976), South Korean voice actress
 Kahi (singer) (born Park Ji-young, 1980), South Korean pop singer and actress
 Seo Ji-young (born 1981), South Korean pop singer, member of girl group Sharp
 Lee Hae-in (actress) (born Lee Ji-young, 1986), South Korean actress
 Kang Ji-young (born 1994), South Korean female idol singer, member of girl group Kara
 Ahn Ji-young (born 1995), South Korean female singer, member of duo Bolbbalgan4
 Kim Ji-young (actress, born 2005), South Korean actress
 Rhee Ji-yeong, South Korean voice actress

Others
 Chung Ji-young (born 1949), South Korean male novelist
 Gong Ji-young (born 1963), South Korean female novelist
 Boo Ji-young (born 1971), South Korean female filmmaker
 Jeannie Chi-Young Suk (born 1973), South Korean-born American female law professor
 Ji-Young Kim (born 1978), South Korean ballerina
 JeeYoung Lee (born 1983), South Korean female visual artist
 Lim Ji-young (born 1995), South Korean female violinist
 Jiyeong Mun (born 1995), South Korean female classical pianist
 Chi-young Kim, South Korean-born American male literary translator

Fictional characters
Kim Ji-young, the title character of the 2016 novel Kim Ji-young, Born 1982
Na Ji-young, the title character of the 2017 television series Individualist Ms. Ji-young
Ji-yeong, a recurring character in the 2021 television series Squid Game
Ji-Young, a Sesame Street Muppet introduced in 2021

See also
List of Korean given names

References

Korean feminine given names